New Astronomy may refer to:
 Astronomia nova, a 1609 book by Johannes Kepler 
 New Astronomy (journal), a scientific journal